Centerville may refer to places in the U.S. state of Louisiana:

Centerville, Evangeline Parish, Louisiana
Centerville, St. Mary Parish, Louisiana
Springville, Louisiana, (also Centerville)